King of Judah may refer the kings of one of the ancient dynasties based in Jerusalem:
Kings of Judah, as named in the Hebrew bible
Hasmonean dynasty
Herodian kingdom

See also
King of the Jews (disambiguation)
Judah (disambiguation)